Burden Brothers (sometimes referred to as the "Beautiful Night" or Evel EP) is the first release by the Burden Brothers. It was released in 2002 on Last Beat Records. Musicians featured on this EP include Mike Rudnicki and Mark Hughes of Baboon, Josh Daugherty of Pinkston and Ben Burt of Brutal Juice.

Track listing
 "Beautiful Night" (Bentley, Lewis) – 4:19
 "Buried in Your Black Heart" (Bentley, Lewis) – 2:17
 "Hang Your Head" (Bentley, Lewis) – 4:52
 "Your Fault" (Bentley, Lewis) – 3:59

Personnel
 Vaden Todd Lewis - vocals, guitar; bass (track 3)
 Taz Bentley - drums
 Josh Daugherty - guitar (tracks 1, 2 and 4)
 Mark Hughes - bass (tracks 1, 2 and 4)
 Mike Rudnicki - guitar
 Ben Burt - percussion (track 3)
 Ean Parsons - guitar (track 4)

References

2003 EPs
Burden Brothers albums